The Hartung–Boothroyd Observatory (HBO) is located atop Mount Pleasant near the Cornell University in Ithaca, New York (US). It is used mainly as a teaching facility for upper-level undergraduate astronomy classes. The observatory is named to recognize funding from M. John Hartung, a 1908 Cornell graduate and later chemical industrialist, and to honor Samuel L. Boothroyd, the founder of Cornell's Department of Astronomy.  The facility was designed and directed from 1974-2012 by James R. Houck.

The primary 0.6m mirror was constructed from a Pyrex 1/8-scale test pouring as part of technology development for the Palomar Observatory 200-inch telescope.  The mirror was polished and mounted in a lightweight tube in the late 1930s under Boothroyd's direction, but World War II deferred its planned use in a high-altitude observatory.  This facility, together with an equatorial fork mount to hold the previously completed telescope, was completed in 1974.

Nearby observatories

Clinton B. Ford Observatory, Ithaca College
Fuertes Observatory, Cornell University
 Kopernik Space Education Center

See also
 List of observatories

References

External links
 Hartung-Boothroyd Observatory

Astronomical observatories in New York (state)
Cornell University buildings
1974 establishments in New York (state)